The 2019–20 season was the 112th season played by Anderlecht. The season covered the period from 1 July 2019 to 30 June 2020. Anderlecht participated in the Belgian First Division A and the Belgian Cup. The club did not participate in any UEFA competition this season, having missed out on European qualification for the first time in 56 years.

Match details

Belgian First Division A

Regular season

Matches

Belgian Cup

Appearances and goals
Source:
Numbers in parentheses denote appearances as substitute.
Players with names struck through and marked  left the club during the playing season.
Players with names in italics and marked * were on loan from another club for the whole of their season with Anderlecht.
Players listed with no appearances have been in the matchday squad but only as unused substitutes.
Key to positions: GK – Goalkeeper; DF – Defender; MF – Midfielder; FW – Forward

See also
2019–20 in Belgian football
2019–20 Belgian First Division A
2019–20 Belgian Cup

References

Anderlecht
R.S.C. Anderlecht seasons
Anderlecht